Cortinarius anisochrous is an agaric fungus in the family Cortinariaceae. Described as new to science in 2013, it is found in Europe.

See also
List of Cortinarius species

References

External links

anisochrous
Fungi of Europe
Fungi described in 2013